Richard H. Golden (1850–1934) was a one-term Democratic mayor of South Norwalk, Connecticut in 1884.

He was the son of John F. Golden and Susan Golden. He was a drummer boy during the Civil War.

He was a real estate broker in South Norwalk in 1885. He founded the Norwalk Building and Loan Association in 1889. He co-founded the South Norwalk Trust Company. He was president in the 1930s before it was merged with City Trust in the 1960s. He was an editor and proprietor of the Daily Sentinel.

He founded Taylor and Golden in 1920 along with Nelson Taylor Jr. Taylor and Golden was purchased by Schoff Darby in 1982.

References 

1850 births
1934 deaths
American financiers
American newspaper editors
Businesspeople in insurance
Connecticut Democrats
Mayors of Norwalk, Connecticut
American real estate brokers